Klausen (Ladin: Tluses or Tlüses) is a comune (municipality) in South Tyrol in northern Italy, located about  northeast of the city of Bolzano.

Geography

Klausen borders the following municipalities: Feldthurns, Lajen, Sarntal, Vahrn, Villanders and Villnöß.

Frazioni
The municipality of Klausen contains the frazioni (subdivisions, mainly villages and hamlets) Gufidaun (Gudon), Latzfons (Lazfons), and Verdings (Verdignes).

History
Klausen is first mentioned in 1027, in a document issued by emperor Conrad II, as Clausa sub Sabiona sita, meaning chasm below the Säben Abbey.

Coat-of-arms
The emblem represents an argent dexter key on gules. The emblem was used as a seal from 1448, known from 1397 and granted in 1540 by Cardinal Bernhard von Cles, Bishop of Brixen.

Society

Linguistic distribution
According to the 2011 census, 91.30% of the population speak German, 7.88% Italian and 0.81% Ladin as first language.

Demographic evolution

Twin / associated cities
 Nuremberg (Germany) since 1970
 Planegg (Germany) since 2006

References

External links

 Homepage of the municipality

Municipalities of South Tyrol